Gigli is a 2003 American romantic comedy film.

Gigli may also refer to:

People
 Abel Gigli (born 1990), Italian footballer 
 Angelo Gigli (born 1983), Italian professional basketball player 
 Beniamino Gigli (1890 – 1957), Italian tenor
 Elena Gigli (born 1985), Italian water polo goalkeeper
 Girolamo Gigli (1660 – 1722), Italian playwright
 Giovanni Cobolli Gigli (born 1945), Italian lawyer and the former president of Juventus Football Club
 Giovanni de' Gigli (dead 1498), medieval Bishop of Worcester
 Giuseppe Cobolli Gigli (1892 – 1987), Italian politician
 Leonardo Gigli (1863 – 1908), Italian obstetrician who invented the Gigli saw
 Romeo Gigli (born 1949), Italian fashion designer 
 Silvestro de' Gigli (died 1521), medieval Bishop of Worcester

Other
 Campanelle (also gigli or riccioli), type of pasta shaped like a bell or flower
 Gigli saw, flexible wire bone saw used by surgeons

See also
 Giglio (disambiguation)
 Gigi (disambiguation)